Islamnagar is a Block and Nagar Panchayat in Badaun district in the Indian state of Uttar Pradesh. Its block code is 0174.

History
Islamnagar is an ancient town in Badaun district. This town is famous for cultural and religious harmony.

Main religions followed in Islamnagar are Hindu and Muslims. People of both the religions lives here happily while respecting each other's religion and culture.

There are famous temples and Mazaar of Peer baba, both the shrines are famous since ancient times.

Since ancient times natives of Islamnagar tried to rename "Islamnagar" and proposed the new name as "Aryanagar". 

During the year 1989 - 1990, a movement was initiated from Bankhandi Mahadev Temple and proposed this new name to District Badaun administration with the help of Bisauli MLA and Sambhal Member of Parliament. But due to lack of political will power this proposal was not accepted and kept pending at Badaun collectorate.

People of Islamnagar even had 3–4 days "hunger strike" at Islamnagar Block and this proposal was referred to District administration by then SDM but further this matter was not further taken up by Islamnagar residents.

IslamNagar has 16 wards. Islamnagar is well known for its cultural harmony and peace among different communities.

It has famous Shiva Temple named as "Shri Bankhandi Mahadev" which is very famous since ancient times and used to have lot of pilgrims specially on Mondays, Shiv ratri and Shravan Maas.

There is a famous real story about this temple that during ancient time some of the farmers were digging their agriculture farm and during this process their "tool" meant for digging had smashed a "big stone" deep inside the field.

It is said and believed that the same "Big Stone" which got smashed unintentionally in the field was an ancient "Shiv Ling". 

Later "Bhagwan Shiv" came in dreams of these farmers and pleaded that they had injured him badly while digging their field.

So, with this inspiration the same broken Shivling was established in the main Shrine and famous temple of "Shri Bankhandi Mahadev" was constructed in Islamnagar.

There is a Shakti Temple named as "Mangala Devi" around 2 km from Islamnagar. This temple is ancient.

A railway line is proposed from Gajraula to Shahjhanpur, which shall be passing bit away from "Islamnagar" and railway station name is proposed as "Bankhandi Road" station with Indian Railways; this project is under hold with railway authorities although land and legal surveys has been made twice during NDA government in 2001.

Moving ahead in this direction, in year 2017 Narendra Modi Govt has already approved Rs 860 Cr for putting up of railway line from Gajraula to Sambhal.

Geography

The town is well connected to
 Delhi via Gajraula-Sambhal-Bahjoi, 195 km / via Babrala-Gunnaur-Narora-Dibai-Bulandshahar-Ghaziabad, 180 km
 Moradabad via Chandausi, 65 km
 Bareilly via Bisauli - Aonla, 95 km
 Bareilly via Badaun-Bilsi, 100 km
 Aligarh via Bahjoi, Babrala, Narora, Atrauli, 110 km (Via Dibai-Bheempur Doraha, 121 km)
 Badaun Via Bilsi, 56 km
 Sambhal via Bahjoi, 35 km
 Ghaziabad via Bahjoi-Babrala-Gunnaur-Narora-Dibai-Bulandshahar-Sikandrabad-Dadri, 165 km

Islamnagar is a main junction point and connected to nearby towns like Chandausi in North, Bisauli North-east, Bilsi in East, Bahjoi in West and Sahaswan in South.

Islamnagar is known for agriculture. Wheat, Peppermint, Mustard and Sugar cane are the main crops getting cultivated in and around Islamnagar. 

Apart from these crops, potatoes are also grown in large quantities in and around Islamnagar.

Since Independence Islamnagar was part of Bisauli Vidhan sabha. But at present it is part of Sahaswan constituency.

Presently Islamnagar is part of Badaun Lok sabha constituency of Badaun district.

But geographically being the very last point of Badaun district and for better connectivity to a district headquarter, locals at Islamnagar are preferring and trying to be part of Sambhal district whereas district facilities are available at Bahjoi which is just 12 km from Islamnagar compared to Badaun which is approx 56 km.

This would be very good for the development, better administration and transport connectivity of Islamnagar.

State Highway (SH 51) passes from Islamnagar. Upgradation and widening (2×2 with divider) of this highway is completed from Gajraula upto the end of Sambhal district. Further widening work for this highway yet to be started in Badaun district.

Ganga Expressway
Ganga Expressway which is 594 Km long, 3+3 Lanes wide from Meerut to Prayagraj shall be passing from Islamnagar and nearby villages. 

Post construction, travel duration from Islamnagar to Prayagraj and Meerut shall be around 7 hours and 2 hours respectively.

It shall be passing about 3.5 Kms away from Islamnagar. Sitholi, Chamarpura, Bhusaya, Bhawanipur and Piwari are some of the villages getting touched by Ganga Expressway. 

Nearest entry / exit point at Ganga expressway for people of Islamnagar shall be at Majhola (near Bahjoi) in district Sambhal. 

Majhola junction point shall be about 12 Kms from Islamnagar and a connecting link way shall be constructed via Mau kathair.

This project was launched and inaugurated by Chief Minister of Uttar Pradesh, Yogi Adityanath on 29th Jan 2019. 

Entire project of Ganga Expressway is expected to complete by March 2024.

Adani group has already started the construction of this project.

Residents of Islamnagar are very much hopeful about developments in and around Islamnagar post construction and starting of this highway. 

Since there are no industrial developments in and around Islamnagar, hopefully this highway shall bring happiness and prosperity and act as catalyst in the development of entire region.

Economy
Almost 80% of the population is engaged in farming and agriculture. 

Remaining 20% people are engaged in small businesses or businesses related to Agriculture and Agri products.

There are two weekly bazaars (Monday and Friday) organized in Islamnagar at Purana Daak khana road (old Post office road) since independence. 

These weekly bazaars gives opportunity to local farmers of nearby villages. These farmers sells fresh vegetables, fruits, Jaggery and other house-hold daily need products to consumers directly without any mediators.

Tourism
Islamnagar is surrounded by many pilgrimage places mainly historical temples. These temples are point of attraction for tourists from all over India.

Apart from ancient Bankhandi mahadev mandir, there are some other ancient temples at nearby areas like Shiv Mandir of Pinauni.

This temple has very big Shiv ling and it is believed that this temple was built during "Mahabharata" period built and worshipped by "Pandavas" while roaming in jungles.

Culture
In Islamnagar, both Hindus and Muslims live in harmony and participate in each other's functions, festivals and rituals.

Hindus do participate in "Ramlila" followed by "Dusshera mela" at the heart of the city in the main bazaar. A permanent Ramlila stage is there with permission from Nagar Panchayat in this regard.

"Kaali Khelna" is being performed by different Akhadas during Navratris. "Ram Baarat" and "Ram Bharat Milaap" along with "Rajgaddi" is played and performed during Ramlila. 

Shravan maas is celebrated with joy and devotion as many local youths go up to "Haridwar" and "Rajghat" to fetch "Ganga Jal" while concluding the "Jalabhishek" at "Shri Bankhandi Mahadev" mandir.

Muslims do celebrate Eid and Moharaam with full devotion. Annual "Urs Mela" is organised at Peer Baba dargah Jyarat.

Education
For good primary education most of the children from city attends schooling in nearby towns at Chandausi and Bahjoi, these two nearby cities had good English medium institutions affiliated to CBSE board.

Apart from this Islamnagar has some intermediate colleges for both boys and girls affiliated to U P Board.

Infrastructure
Islamnagar has assorted trade facility and local traders display their goods, vegetables, spices, jaggary, etc during weekly bazaars on mondays and fridays respectively.

There is a big Arya Samaj Dharamshala in the main market in the heart of city, where marriages and other religious rituals are performed.

Despite main point of attraction in political arena, there are no such industries in and around Islamnagar. 

There is very good connectivity to New Delhi (Anand Vihar ISBT) along with Badaun, as U.P State road transport corporation runs good number of buses at every 30-45 mins to both these destinations.

In past, Islamnagar police station (Thana) was located in the heart of town, which is now converted into a Police chowki. 

The new police station is now relocated at Bahjoi road near "Block". 

Primary health centre of Islamnagar is located at "Lalbagh".

The proposed Railway station of Islamanagar will be named as "Bankhandi Road" and shall be constructed at "Kandarpur" village near Bankhandi Mahadev Mandir. Land adhigrahan survey was already conducted almost 15 years back. This railway station will be approx 3 km away from main city.

Banks and ATMs
In 2017, State Bank of India was relocated to "Mughal mohalla" near "Lal Bagh".

The IFSC Code of SBI Islam nagar is SBIN0001696. The MICR code is 202002105.

This is the biggest SBI branch in entire district Badaun with approx 15000 square feet area.

State Bank of India, Gramin Bank and Punjab National Bank have branches in Islamnagar with ATM facilities are provided to citizens.

ICICI Bank and HDFC Bank had already made survey to open their branches in Islamnagar and if things went well new branches of these private banks shall be opened in Islamnagar by 2026.

Demographics
As of 2011 India census, Islamnagar block had a population of ;1,80,465.and Islamnagar city population of 67883. The Malesnstitute 51% of the population and females 49%. Islamnagar has an average literacy rate of 57%, lower than the national average of 67.5%: male literacy is 46%, and female literacy is 40%. There are 54 villages in islamnagar block.

References

Cities and towns in Budaun district
Blocks in Budaun District